Dirk van Brederode ( 1256, Santpoort – 16 December 1318, Rheims), died on his journey back from Palestina. He was buried in the Dominican church in Rheims.

The son and heir of William I van Brederode, he was nicknamed 'the Good'. Dirk van Brederode became lord of Brederode in 1285, bailiff of Kennemerland in 1288, and was knighted in 1290. He married around 1290 with Mary van der Lecke, daughter of Hendrik II, lord of the Leck and Jutte van Borsele.

He took part in, amongst others, the campaign against Friesland in 1288 under the command of Floris V of Holland, with a fleet of ships. In the same year he led an army sent by Floris V to Utrecht to arrest the lords of Amstel and Woerden.

Children 
Dirk II had at least three children with Mary van der Lecke (c. 1272 – 1307):
Catharina van Brederode (c. 1285 – 1372), married John I, Lord of Polanen
William van Brederode (c. 1287 – 1316), William died two years before his father, causing his son Dirk III van Brederode to succeed him as lord of Brederode.
Jutta van Brederode (c. 1298 – 1346)

External links 
 Dirk II van Brederode "de Goede" (abt. 1260 – 1318) (Dutch)

1250s births
1318 deaths
Dirk
People from Velsen
13th-century people of the Holy Roman Empire
14th-century people of the Holy Roman Empire